The Biggest Bluff is a book written by Maria Konnikova published by Penguin Press in 2020. Maria is a psychologist, television producer and a Russian-American writer. In this book she explained about her poker journey of being a complete novice to poker champ after hiring few world best poker trainer. She explained that poker helps to improve psychology.

References

Further reading
 
 
 

2020 non-fiction books
Poker books
Penguin Press books